The 2013 Tuvalu A-Division was the 13th season of top flight association football in Tuvalu. The season started on 9 March 2013 and finished on 6 April 2013. The champions were Nauti FC who won their eighth league title.

Clubs

Standings

Round 1

Round 2

Round 3

Round 4

Round 5

Top goalscorers

Awards

Best Player
The best player for the tournament was Eric Tealofi of FC Tofaga.

References

External links 
 TNFA Official Website
Dutch Support Tuvalu Foundation

Tuvalu A-Division seasons
1
Tuvalu